Leave Us Alone is a 1975 Danish drama film directed by Ernst Johansen and Lasse Nielsen. It was entered into the 25th Berlin International Film Festival. The plot is similar to that of Lord of the Flies: A group of teenagers are stranded on an uninhabited island, and an initially pleasant vacation turns into a nightmare.

Cast
 Anja Bærentzen
 Ivan Baumann
 Søren Christiansen
 Helle Droob
 Martin Højmark
 Ole Meyer

Allegations of abuse
In the spring of 2018, it was discovered in the media that many child actors, both male and female, involved in the film were subjected to sexual abuse during filming. According to the allegations, the abuse was allegedly committed by directors Lasse Nielsen and Ernst Johansen.

References

External links

 La' os være at the Danish Film Institute 

1975 films
Danish drama films
1970s Danish-language films
1975 drama films